The Slow Rust of Forgotten Machinery, subtitled Or: Where Do We Draw The Line Now?, is the ninth studio album released by progressive rock group The Tangent. The special edition of the album contains a bonus track.

Track listing
All songs by Andy Tillison, except where noted.

Personnel 
Andy Tillison – keyboards, vocals and drums
Jonas Reingold – bass guitar
Theo Travis – saxophones and flutes
Luke Machin – guitars and vocals
Marie-Eve de Gaultier -  keyboards and vocals

with:
Boff Whalley - vocals (5)
Matt Farrow - DJ (6)

References 

2017 albums
The Tangent albums
Inside Out Music albums